San Luis Obispo High School, also referred to as "San Luis High" and "SLO High", is an American public high school in San Luis Obispo, California. It is the only non-continuation public high school within the city.  The school is within the San Luis Coastal Unified School District (SLCUSD), serving primarily students living in San Luis Obispo.  Before the school's addition of ninth grade in 1982, the school was known as "San Luis Obispo Senior High School" (SLOSH). School colors are black and gold.

Notable alumni 
 Jay Asher, author
 Townsend Bell, auto racing driver
 Ed Brown, professional football
 Katie Burkhart, National Pro Fastpitch Softball
 Tim Kubinski, Major League Baseball
 Brooks Lee, Major League Baseball
 Jim Lonborg, Major League Baseball
 Double Take, musical duo
 Chris Pontius, actor
 Jeff Powers, water polo
 Mel Queen, Major League Baseball
 The Revels, rock band
 Chris Seitz, Major League Soccer
 Gilbert H. Stork, president of Cuesta College
 Paul Sverchek, National Football League

Athletics
San Luis Obispo High School is part of the CIF Central Section. The Tigers compete as members of the Central Coast Athletic Association. Athletic offerings include: cross country, football, volleyball, water polo, cheer, basketball, soccer, wrestling, swimming, baseball, golf, tennis, volleyball, stunt, and track & field.

CIF Championships
CIF Southern Section Champion Swim Team (boys): 1982 (Div. 2-A), 1985 (2-A), 1986 (2-A), 1989 (2-A), 2005 (Div. II)
CIF Southern Section Champion Swim Team (girls): 1993 (Div. III)
CIF Southern Section Football Champions: 1947 (Northern Division), 1960 (Div. A), 1968 (Div. AA), 1980 (Northwestern), 2001 (Div. IV)
CIF Southern Section Soccer Champions (boys): 1998 (Div. IV)
CIF Southern Section Soccer Champions (girls): 2016, 2018, 2019, 2020, 2022
CIF Southern Section Tennis Champions (girls): 1990 (Div. 1-A)
CIF Southern Section Track & Field Champions (girls): 2008 (Div. III), 2009 (III)
CIF Southern Section Volleyball Champions (girls): 1989 (Div. 2-A)
CIF Southern Section Baseball Champions: 1958 (Northern Group), 1959 (3-A), 1990 (4-A), 2000 (Div. IV)
CIF Southern Section Basketball Champions (boys): 1952 (Northern Group)
CIF Southern Section Basketball Champions (girls): 1985 (Div. 2-A), 1995 (III-A)
CIF State Cross Country Champions (boys): 2003 (Div. III) (also SS Div. III champs) / 2021 (Div. 2)
CIF State Volleyball Champions (girls): 2018 (Div. IV)
CIF Central Section Cross Country Champions (girls, Division 2) 2018 and 2019
CIF Central Section Cross Country Champions (boys, Division 1) 2022
CIF Central Section Track and Field Champions (girls, Division 2) 2022
CIF Central Section Track and Field Champions (boys, Division 2) 2022

References

External links 
 School website

High schools in San Luis Obispo County, California
Public high schools in California
Buildings and structures in San Luis Obispo, California
1895 establishments in California